Probergrothius nigricornis is a species of bug found in tropical Asia. They feed primarily on the seeds of Malvales. 

The antennae are all black, the first and second segments nearly equal and the third is the shortest. The fore femora are serrate on the underside. P. sanguinolens which overlaps in distribution has the terminal antennal segment pale and the second segment longer than the first.

References 

Pyrrhocoridae
Species described in 1861